Garwood Valley is a valley opening on the coast of Victoria Land, Antarctica, just south of Cape Chocolate. It is largely ice-free, but is occupied near its head by the Garwood Glacier. It was named by Thomas Griffith Taylor of the British Antarctic Expedition, 1910–13, in association with Garwood Glacier.

References

Valleys of Victoria Land
McMurdo Dry Valleys